Ulla is a feminine given name.

Ulla may also refer to:

Places
 Ulla, a part of Nohra, a municipality in Thuringia, Germany
 Ulla, a small fishing community on the island of Haramsøya, Norway
 Ullà, Catalonia, Spain, a village
 Ulla River, Galicia, Spain
 , a left tributary of River Daugava, Belarus
 Mount Ulla, a peak in the Asgard mountain range, Antarctica
 909 Ulla, an asteroid

Other uses
 Ulla (instrument), a traditional Korean percussion instrument
 The cry of the Martians in The War of the Worlds and its adaptations
 Ulla (Talmudist), a 3rd-4th century rabbi
"Ulla", a song by Goldfrapp from Tales of Us

See also 
 
 Ulla Ulla National Reserve in Bolivia